Since 2016, Mali has been divided into ten regions and one capital district. A reorganization of the country from eight to nineteen regions was passed into law in 2012, but of the new regions, only Taoudénit (partitioned from Tombouctou Region) and Ménaka (formerly Ménaka Cercle in Gao Region) have begun to be implemented. Each of the regions bears the name of its capital. The regions are divided into 56 cercles. The cercles and the capital district are divided into 703 communes.

Demographics
The most populated region is Sikasso with 2.648 million people, and the least most populated is Kidal with just 38 thousand people.

Geography
Five regions are composed of mainly desert, however, they also have half the country's land mass. The largest region is Taoudénit and the smallest is Ségou, excluding Bamako.

Regions
The regions are numbered, originally west to east, with Roman numerals. The capital Bamako is administered separately and is in its own district.
The ten regions and the Bamako District are listed below. The population figures are from the 1998 and 2009 censuses.

See also
List of regions of Mali by Human Development Index
Cercles of Mali
ISO 3166-2:ML

References

 
Subdivisions of Mali
Mali, Regions
Mali 1
Regions, Mali
Mali geography-related lists